Busia may refer to:

Places
Busia County, a county of Kenya
Busia District, a district of Uganda
Busia, Kenya, a Kenyan town on the border with Uganda
Busia, Uganda, a Ugandan town on the border with Kenya

People
Kofi Abrefa Busia, Prime Minister of Ghana 1969–1972
Akosua Busia, Ghanaian-American actress